Ennab  is a Syrian village located in Al-Suqaylabiyah Nahiyah in Al-Suqaylabiyah District, Hama.  According to the Syria Central Bureau of Statistics (CBS), Ennab had a population of 2774 in the 2004 census.

References 

Populated places in al-Suqaylabiyah District
Populated places in al-Ghab Plain